The 1982 Big Eight men's basketball tournament was held March 2–6 at a combination of on-campus gymnasiums and Kemper Arena in Kansas City, Missouri.

Top-seeded Missouri defeated  in the championship game, 68–63, to win their second Big Eight men's basketball tournament.

The Tigers, in turn, received an automatic bid to the 1982 NCAA tournament. They were joined in the tournament by fellow Big Eight member Kansas State, who earned an at-large bid.

Format
All eight of the conference's members participated in the tournament field. They were seeded based on regular season conference records, with all teams placed and paired in the initial quarterfinal round.

All first-round games were played on the home court of the higher-seeded team. The semifinals and championship game, in turn, were played at a neutral site at Kemper Arena in Kansas City, Missouri.

Bracket

References

Tournament
Big Eight Conference men's basketball tournament
Big Eight Conference men's basketball tournament
Big Eight Conference men's basketball tournament